William Philipps may refer to:
William Philipps (MP for Haverfordwest) (c. 1615–c. 1689), Welsh politician
William Philipps (MP for Bath) (died 1444), English politician
William Philipps (MP for Pembrokeshire) for 1559, MP for Pembrokeshire

See also
William Phillips (disambiguation)
William Phillipps (disambiguation)